Vasseko Karamoko (born 14 January 1987 in Saint-Denis, France) is a French former professional footballer who played as a forward on the professional level for French Ligue 2 club Guingamp during the 2006–07 season.

References

1987 births
Living people
French footballers
Association football forwards
En Avant Guingamp players
Sportspeople from Saint-Denis, Seine-Saint-Denis
Footballers from Seine-Saint-Denis
21st-century French people